Ralph Brubaker is an American professor, specializing in bankruptcy, who is currently the Carl L. Vacketta Professor of Law at University of Illinois College of Law and formerly a member of the faculty at Emory University School of Law.

References

Living people
University of Illinois Urbana-Champaign faculty
American legal scholars
Year of birth missing (living people)
Place of birth missing (living people)
Finance law scholars
Emory University School of Law faculty